Hunchun River, is a river located in the Yanbian Korean Autonomous Prefecture, in the Chinese province of Jilin. It is the tributary of the left bank of the Tumen River.

References

Rivers of Jilin